Hafizh Syahrin bin Abdullah (born 5 May 1994) is a Malaysian motorcycle racer, set to race in WorldSBK in 2022 With MIE Honda. In 2018, he became the first ever Southeast Asian to race in the MotoGP category.

Career

Early career
Hafizh was born on 5 May 1994 in Selangor, Malaysia, and grew up in Selangor. He began his career at the age of 9, in pocket bikes, where he eventually acquired the nickname "King of Pocket Bikes". It was not long before his talent began to show, after his racing debut on pocket bikes the following year. Dominating the pocket bike category soon after, he was discovered by Leong at one of the pocket bike tracks, purely by chance.

In 2007, at the age of 13, Hafizh made his debut in the Cub Prix championship in dominating style, finishing his first year on the Yamaha LC135 Cup class second overall.

His form continued the following year, as Petronas Sprinta Raceline team's youngest rider, taking 3rd overall in the Yamaha Givi Cup in 2008, and in the process also making waves through his entries in the Novice category, with similarly impressive results.

Hafizh started the 2009 season on a high, winning the opening race of the season at Alor Setar with a win in the Novice category. With 7 wins out of 8 rounds, and the other also being a podium finish, his dominance in the category was so unrivalled that he opted to forego the final two rounds. The youngster switched to race against his more illustrious and seasoned seniors in the Expert category, finishing with podium results. He also finished third in the Asia Road Racing Underbone 115cc Championship.

Graduating to take on the expert category in 2010, the switch was seamless as Hafizh literally broke down all the barriers, and tore the competition apart. Despite a massive revamp in the technical regulations that led to the renaming of the expert category to become the CP130 category, these changes did little to rattle Hafizh's cage.

By the time the season drew to a close in Penang's Padang Kota Lama, the 16-year-old had finished off the competition, to emerge as the championship's youngest ever CP130 champion, erasing the record set by Norizman Ismail who was the Expert champion in 2005 at the age of 20.

2010 was also significant as the 16-year-old made the step up to the bigger league, the Petronas Asia Road Racing Championship aboard a 600cc SuperSport bike. Against a much older and experienced field, the youngster held his own to finish his debut season in a respectable 12th from 39 riders. He finished fourth in the same series in 2011. He moved into the Spanish Moto2 series in 2012, finishing sixth there.

Moto2 World Championship
In 2012, wild-card Hafizh led during the middle stages of his home Malaysian Grand Prix, on his way to a fourth place. The result was later promoted to a third-place finish, after Anthony West's results were annulled in November 2013, due to doping.

In the 2013 Moto2 World Championship, Hafizh made four more wildcard appearances, scoring a point at his home race in Malaysia.

Petronas Raceline Malaysia (2014–2017)
Hafizh moved into Moto2 full-time in 2014, riding the lone Kalex for the Petronas Raceline Malaysia team. He finished the season in 19th position, with 42 points, and a season's best 7th place finish in the United States Grand Prix.

For the 2015 Moto2 World Championship, Hafizh made further improvements by collecting 64 points, with a season best finish of 5th at the Japanese Grand Prix, and ending the year 16th in the championship standings.

In 2016, Hafizh surprised many people by finishing 4th at three Grands Prixs (Qatar, Catalunya and Britain) and finishing ten Grands Prixs in the top 10. He collected 118 points total, and finished the championship in 9th position.

In 2017, he made a slow start to the year, but started making an impact in the second half of the season, when he scored his second podium in the category, with another 3rd place in the San Marino Grand Prix, which was later turned into a second place after Dominique Aegerter was disqualified. Later, he had another strong result by taking the 3rd podium of his Moto2 career, when he get 3rd position in a wet race at the Japanese Grand Prix, making it two podiums within 3 races. He ended that season 10th overall, with 106 points.

MotoGP World Championship

Monster Yamaha Tech 3 (2018)
Just a week before the 2018 MotoGP Sepang pre-season test, Jonas Folger made a surprise announcement that he would not compete in the 2018 season, in order to recover from his Gilbert's syndrome health problems. The head of the Monster Yamaha Tech3 team, Hervé Poncharal, had a discussion with SIC Petronas CEO Razlan Razali, and their main sponsor Yamaha Asia, about the possibility of replacing Folger with Hafizh. He was given the opportunity to take part in the early pre-season test at the Circuit of Buriram, a track Hafizh knew well. Hafizh, nicknamed "El Pescao", made an impressive performance on his 1st ever run on a MotoGP bike, by clocking a lap time as good as the other rookies, though this may have been boosted by the unavailability of other riders on the grid who had contracts with other teams, leading to test riders like Yonny Hernandez getting an opportunity. Nevertheless, Monster Yamaha Tech3 was delighted with his potential, and signed Hafizh to fill Jonas Folger's seat for the 2018 season.

Hafizh did well in his first MotoGP season, when he fought for Rookie of the Year before losing out to Franco Morbidelli by only 4 points. His best result of the season came in the second round at Argentina, when he finished 9th after starting from 23rd. Hafizh ended the year 16th in the standings, with 46 points. On 6 June 2018, Tech3 announced that they would retain Hafizh for 2019, in a new era for Hervé Poncharal's team, that would see him make the switch to a factory spec KTM machine.

Red Bull KTM Tech 3 (2019)
Hafizh would again ride for Tech3, this time riding a KTM alongside new rookie teammate Miguel Oliveira. He only finished six races in the points, scoring 9 points total. The team announced they would not renew his contract, and will replace him with Brad Binder for the 2020 season, but Binder later moved up to the Factory KTM Team for 2020, following Johann Zarco taking the decision to leave the team after only 1 year of his 2 year deal. This led to Hafizh being instead replaced by Iker Lecuona.

Return to Moto2

Aspar Team (2020)
After losing his spot in MotoGP, Hafizh returned to Moto2 with the Aspar Team for the 2020 Moto2 World Championship. He started the season well, scoring a sixth place in the second round at Jerez, but only finished in the point scoring places three times after that race, scoring a total of 21 points.

NTS RW Racing GP (2021)
Hafizh switched teams for the 2021 season, but struggled again, scoring points in only three races, 9 total points in the season. He switched to WorldSBK in 2022

Superbike World Championship

MIE Racing Honda Team (2022)
Hafizh struggling with the Honda machinery but made a decent start ahead of his Superbike World Championship debut.

Career statistics

Grand Prix motorcycle racing

By season

By class

Races by year
(key) (Races in bold indicate pole position, races in italics indicate fastest lap)

Superbike World Championship

By season

Races by year
(key) (Races in bold indicate pole position) (Races in italics indicate fastest lap)

* Season still in progress.

References

External links

1994 births
Living people
Malaysian motorcycle racers
Malaysian Muslims
Malaysian racing drivers
People from Selangor
MotoGP World Championship riders
Moto2 World Championship riders
Superbike World Championship riders
Tech3 MotoGP riders
World Touring Car Cup drivers
Engstler Motorsport drivers